St. Laurent (sometimes written in French as Saint Laurent or in German as Sankt Laurent) is a highly aromatic dark-skinned wine grape variety. Its origins shrouded in mystery, St. Laurent is believed to have resulted from a crossing of Pinot noir with an unknown second parent. However, current DNA research done at HBLAWO Klosterneuberg in Austria by Dr. Ferdinand Regner has now confirmed the genetic link of St. Laurent to Pinot Noir. A link to a second parent was not able to be confirmed in this research, which led Dr. Regner to conclude that St. Laurent is either a 'selfing' or seedling of Pinot Noir, or it is the result of hybridization with an as yet unidentified second parent. This work confirms that St. Laurent is the direct genetic offspring of Pinot Noir.  

St. Laurent is the most widely planted red grape variety in the Czechia, growing in all wine subregions in both Moravia and Bohemia.

In Austria, St. Laurent is the third most popular red grape variety and is primarily grown in Lower Austria and Burgenland.

Offspring
 Zweigelt was created in 1922 by Fritz Zweigelt by crossing Blaufränkisch and St. Laurent.
 André was bred in 1960 by J. Horák by crossing St. Laurent and Blaufränkisch, and entered into the Czech State Register of Grape Varieties in 1980.
 Neronet is (St. Laurent x Blauer Portugieser) x (Alicante Bouschet x Cabernet Sauvignon), where Alicante Bouschet x Cabernet Sauvignon was given the name Alibernet.
 Rondo is Zarya Severa x St. Laurent. It was initially labelled Gm 6494-5, as it was number 5 in a series of similar crosses. Other members of the Gm 6494 population were used to create Bronner, Baron, Cabernet Carbon, Prior and Souvignier gris.

Synonyms
St. Laurent is known under the following synonyms: Blauer Saint Laurent, Chvartser, Laourentstraoube, Laurenzitraube, Laurenztraube, Lorentstraube, Lorenztraube, Lovrenac Crni, Lovrijenac, Lovrijenac Crni, Saint Laurent noir, Saint Lorentz, Sankt Laurent, Sankt Lorenztraube, Sant Lorentz, Schwarzer, Schwarzer Lorenztraube, Sent Laourent, Sent Lovrenka, Sentlovrenka, Shentlovrenka, Shvartser, St. Laurent, Svati Vavrinetz, Svatovavřinecké, Svatovavrinetske, Svatovavrinetzke, Svätovavrinecké, Svaty Vavrinec, Szent Lőrinc, Szent Lőrinczi, Szent Loerine, Szentlőrinc, Vavrinak

References

Further reading
 
 

Kaj Björk (2014) "Alla dessa druvor" 

Red wine grape varieties
Czech wine
Austrian wine